The posterior ulnar recurrent artery is an artery in the forearm. It is one of two recurrent arteries that arises from the ulnar artery, the other being the anterior ulnar recurrent artery. The posterior ulnar recurrent artery being much larger than the anterior and also arises somewhat lower than it.

It passes backward and medialward on the flexor digitorum profundus, behind the flexor digitorum superficialis muscle, and ascends behind the medial epicondyle of the humerus.

In the interval between this process and the olecranon, it lies beneath the flexor carpi ulnaris, and ascending between the heads of that muscle, in relation with the ulnar nerve, it supplies the neighboring muscles and the elbow-joint, and anastomoses with the superior and inferior ulnar collateral arteries and the interosseous recurrent arteries.

See also
 Anterior ulnar recurrent artery

References

External links
 
 

Arteries of the upper limb